NPZ may refer to:

 SBB-CFF-FFS RBDe 560, a Swiss push-pull trainset, generally known as the Neuer Pendelzug (New Commuter Train)
 Fujicolor Pro 800Z, a photographic film previously known as Fujicolor NPZ 800
 NPZ model, a mathematical model of marine ecosystem